The Invisible Empire: The Ku Klux Klan in Florida is a 2001 book about the Ku Klux Klan by Michael Newton.

Overview
A look into the Invisible Empire of Ku Klux Klan activity in Florida, beginning with the days of Reconstruction and ending at the present day.

References

Reviews 
 Mason P. Review of Newton, Michael, The Ku Klux Klan in Mississippi: A History. // H-CivWar, H-Net Reviews. November, 2010. 
 Ortiz P. Review of The Invisible Empire: The Ku Klux Klan in Florida, by Michael Newton // Journal of Southern History. — 2004. — Vol. 70, № 4. — P. 949—950. — .
 Zuber G. Michael Newton. The Invisible Empire: The Ku Klux Klan in Florida. The Florida History and Culture Series. Gainesville: University Press of Florida. 2001. xiii+260 pages // The Journal of Southern Religion. — 2002. — Vol. 5. 

2001 non-fiction books
American non-fiction books
Works about White Americans
Ku Klux Klan in Florida
Identity politics
Non-fiction books about racism
Books about Florida
English-language books
Works about white nationalism
Books about the Ku Klux Klan
University Press of Florida books